The Catholic Church in Palestine is part of the worldwide Catholic Church, under the spiritual leadership of the Pope in Rome.

There are over 80,000 Catholics in Jerusalem and the Palestinian territories (the Gaza Strip and the West Bank), mostly in the agglomeration between Ramallah and Bethlehem, including the West Bank-suburbs of Jerusalem. Adherents are mostly of the Latin Church, but there is also a small community of the Melkite Catholic Patriarchate of Antioch and Jerusalem, belonging to the Melkite Catholic Church. Both are in full communion with the Holy See as part of the worldwide Catholic Church.

There are two archbishops of Jerusalem, one for each jurisdiction. The jurisdiction of the Latin Patriarchate of Jerusalem in Jerusalem and the Palestinian territories includes 17 parishes, two of which are in Jerusalem. The current Latin Patriarch of Jerusalem is Pierbattista Pizzaballa.

See also
 Catholic Church in Israel
 Catholic Church in the Middle East
 Latin Patriarchate of Jerusalem
 List of parishes of the Latin Patriarchate of Jerusalem
 Our Lady of Palestine
 Custody of the Holy Land
 Latin Church in the Middle East
 Redemptoris nostri cruciatus
 Catholic Near East Welfare Association

References

Society of the State of Palestine
Palestinian
Palestinian